The Hyesan mine (혜산청년광산) is one of the largest silver mines in North Korea and in the world. The mine is located in the north of the country in Ryanggang Province. The mine has estimated reserves of 3.07 million oz of gold and 921.6 million oz of silver. The mine also has reserves amounting to 160 million tonnes of ore grading 0.35% copper, 3.2% lead and 3.6% zinc .

References 

Gold mines in North Korea
Copper mines in North Korea
Silver mines in North Korea
Lead mines in North Korea
Zinc mines in North Korea